Urumbilum River, a perennial stream of the Clarence River catchment, is located in the Northern Tablelands and Northern Rivers districts of New South Wales, Australia.

Course and features
Urumbilum River rises on the eastern slopes of the Dorrigo Plateau, Great Dividing Range, east of Dorrigo in Bindarri National Park, and flows generally northeast and east, before reaching its confluence with the Orara River, northwest of Upper Orara. The river descends  over its  course; and flows through the Bindarri National Park in its upper reaches.

See also

 Rivers of New South Wales

References

 

Rivers of New South Wales
Northern Tablelands
Northern Rivers